Deona Mandi is a town and union council of Gujrat District, in the Punjab province of Pakistan. It is located at 32°38'0N 74°0'0E with an altitude of 231 metres (761 feet).

References

Union councils of Gujrat District
Populated places in Gujrat District